is a video game developed by Epoch and published by Sunsoft.

Summary
This video game was released exclusively in Japan on December 18, 1992 for the Nintendo Family Computer. As the title suggests, it is a video game where players use a Barcode Battler II (a card-scanning handheld) together with a Nintendo-licensed Famicom-Barcode Battler interface that came packaged with the game and not sold separately. A special set of Barcode Battler cards with barcodes imprinted on them were also required to play the game including the "White Card" that enabled players to scan any barcode (especially ones found on consumer products).

Barcode World includes barcode cards that feature characters from many Sunsoft series, most notably Hebereke and Gimmick!, however using the White Card included with the game, players were also given the ability to scan a wide range of consumer products. Released during a period of great interest in barcode-swiping games in Japan, the game dates itself as directly from the early 1990s, however the game still functions today exactly as it did then and modern products may also be scanned in order to generate new content for the game (RPG-style stats and attributes, etc.).

Legacy
The use of the Barcode Battler unit in conjunction with the Famicom was made possible using the Famicom-Barcode Battler interface – a connector cable that came with the Barcode World cassette. In this way, the Famicom was given the capacity to scan external barcodes to expand gameplay for the game to include all manner of household consumer products. Soon books were released by third parties that listed in detail which consumer products had the strongest barcodes. Today, the setup has been seen as a precursor to the 2001 Nintendo e-Reader for the Game Boy Advance. The two devices are very similar in that they serve the same purpose: to scan specially designed cards with barcodes imprinted on them as the primary means of using the device. The game continues to be played today often in emulated form, and modern emulators like FCEUX feature support specifically for the unusual Barcode World setup.

See also
 Nintendo e-Reader
 Sunsoft
 List of Famicom games

References

External links
 Atari HQ

1992 video games
Crossover video games
Epoch Co. games
Japan-exclusive video games
Nintendo Entertainment System games
Nintendo Entertainment System-only games
Strategy video games
Sunsoft games
Video games developed in Japan
Video games using barcodes